Stuart Clarke is a fictional character appearing in American comic books published by Marvel Comics. The character is depicted as an ex-supervillain who first fought as Rampage against the short-lived Champions team. He is an ally of the Punisher, replacing Microchip. He first appeared in The Champions #5 (April 1976).

Fictional character biography
Stuart Clarke was born in East Lansing, Michigan. He was working as an engineer at a company when he created an exo-skeleton suit. His company was bankrupted by recession, and he attempted a bank robbery but battled and was defeated by the Champions. He was freed from custody by Griffin and Darkstar. He battled the Champions again, and was injured in an explosion. Clarke subsequently needed to use a wheelchair, and sought revenge on the Champions soon after their disbanding. He manages to hypnotize Iceman and entrap him in one of the Rampage suits, forcing him to battle Angel and a visiting Spider-Man.

Clarke ends up homeless and his suits are stored away in a lab, their secrets pored over by profit-minded scientists. Clarke has secreted away a small device that allows him over the course of many weeks, to unlock the control protocols for the suit. Eventually they literally bust out by themselves. Clarke and several of his homeless friends put on the suits and become known as the Recession Raiders. They soon get into a fight with Wonder Man and Beast. The fight gets dangerous when the suit hits Beast with a brick chimney. Enraged, Wonder Man subdues the entire squad. Beast recovers after a short hospital stay.

Wonder Man's enemy Lotus springs Clarke from jail and participates in the creation of the armored team Armed Response. Alongside Splice and Armed Response, Rampage was sent by Lotus to battle Wonder Man and the super-powered group, the Crazy-Eight. The eight, all personal friends of Wonder Man, manage to summon Wonder Man's help and the villains are defeated. During the fight Rampage hesitates to kill several Eight members; wondering instead if he might be able to use them to create better technology.

Rampage and his suit become the base for a private security force for Los Angeles. This group is called 'Armed Response' and are secretly corrupt. The Crazy-Eight deliver proof of this to the media, despite Armed Response's attempt to murder them. The force is shut down.

Years later, Stuart Clarke is working for magnate and super-criminal Sunset Bain, together with Parnell Jacobs - the villainous War Machine. Clarke apparently built an entirely new armor, retro-engineering from the original, which had been found by Jacobs. After a successful test of fire, Clarke upgraded the armor considerably, but was fired by Bain after it failed to destroy Iron Man. Later, when he is working with the Punisher (see below) he uses Castle to eliminate Bain, who had been setting him and Jacobs against each other.

Punisher
Stuart is seen working with the Punisher during the Civil War. He is obsessed with Iron Man and is giving the Punisher the means to track down high tech supervillains; after this Frank takes down Stilt-Man and Tinkerer. For a time, Clarke serves in the capacity of the Punisher's former weapons expert and information gatherer, Microchip.

Over the course of the series, Stuart begins to form a strong admiration for Frank and Frank's war on crime. When G.W. Bridge and Jigsaw both up the stakes in their separate attempts to track down Frank, Stuart is forced to go into hiding with Diamonelle, a woman who had been tending to Frank's wounds.

Later when the news hits that Frank has been apprehended by S.H.I.E.L.D., Stuart is willing to risk his own life for the "only friend he ever had who never let him down". Before he can follow through he is shot multiple times by Diamonelle who is revealed to be a double agent and in the process also revealed to Stuart that Frank killed his girlfriend, Tati, in an earlier trip to Mexico.

Stuart survived the shooting, having lost three of his fingers on one of his hands. Rampage appeared among the members of Hood's Crime Syndicate. In Secret Invasion, he is among the many supervillains who rejoined the Hood's crime syndicate and attacked an invading Skrull force. In the midst of the invasion, Clarke learned that the Punisher was in fact responsible for killing his girlfriend and swears to kill Frank, donning his Rampage costume again. Amidst a battle between skrulls, he corners Frank and Bridge. When the three are later attacked by a Skrull sniper, Clarke opts to take down the Skrull as he has powers, during this the Punisher learns Clarke's imprisonment was because he killed a cop, leading to a battle between the two. The concludes with both being trapped in a room where the Skrulls fired a rocket into, leaving Clarke heavily scarred, in a manner similar to Jigsaw, and vowing revenge on Frank Castle.

Clarke begins a life of white-collar crime, during which he encounters and allies with Jigsaw. Together, "the Jigsaw Brothers" hire Lady Gorgon to impersonate Maria Castle while they manipulate Jigsaw's estranged son, Henry, into helping them with their plot to capture and kill the Punisher. When Henry betrays them, Clarke tries to kill him, but he is stopped by Jigsaw, who stabs and shoots Clarke while at the same time admitting that he is right about Henry being a liability.

Clarke somehow turned up alive, as he was later shown to be among the attendees of a supervillain gathering that was crashed by Iron Man (Victor von Doom).

During the "Search for Tony Stark" arc, Rampage is seen as a member of Hood's gang as they attack Castle Doom. He and Shockwave held Doctor Doom's arms as Wrecker works to break open his Iron Man armor.

Powers and abilities
Stuart Clarke is a genius, with an advanced degree in engineering. As Rampage, he possessed a power suit that gave him superhuman strength and durability.

References

External links
 
 

Comics characters introduced in 1976
Characters created by Don Heck
Fictional characters from Michigan
Fictional characters with disfigurements
Fictional engineers
Fictional inventors
Marvel Comics characters with superhuman strength
Marvel Comics supervillains
Punisher characters
Vigilante characters in comics